Ruchi was a literary magazine published in Gujarati language by author and journalist Chunilal Madia from January 1963 to December 1968.

History
Chunilal Madia left United States Information Service in 1962 and started Ruchi monthly. He termed it as a magazine for creative thought.  It published its last issue in December 1968 as Madia died the same month.

Content 
Ruchi published analysis of literary and cultural trends in Gujarati as well as other Indian languages and world.

Madia himself wrote a column Chhindu Kholta under pen name Akho Rupero. He also wrote on social issues in Bahyantar column. He had also written on several prominent personalities and authors in it such as Virchand Gandhi, Krishnaji Holaji Aara, Abdul Rahim, Apabhai Almelkar, Jayant Khatri, Ishwar Petlikar, Umashankar Joshi, Albert Camus, Jean-Paul Sartre, Henry Miller, Behramji Malabari, Octavio Paz, Karl Marx, Shayda , Jhaverchand Meghani, Jyotindra Dave, Dhoomketu, Samuel Johnson, Dag Hammarskjöld, Yevgeny Yevtushenko, Mikhail Sholokhov, Romain Rolland, Boris Pasternak, Leo Tolstoy, Anton Chekhov, Ernest Hemingway, D. H. Lawrence as well as on modern literature. Vadilal Dagli wrote a column Mumbai-ni Diary focused on Mumbai and issues of India. Jayant Pathak published his autobiography Vananchal in serial. Manubhai Pancholi's novel Kurukshetra was started in it but stopped after some episodes. Alan Paton's play, Cry, the Beloved Country was translated by Madia as Bhom Rade Bhenkar which stopped after just three episodes. Several other writers published criticism, essays and works on authors in it.
The cover art and other art in magazine were drawn by various artists such as Raghav Kaneria, Abhay Khatau, K. K. Hebbar, Krishnaji Holaji Aara, Abdul Rahim, Apabhai Almelkar, Bhanu Shah, Leena Sanghvi, Dinesh Shah, Chhaganlal Jadav, Jyoti Bhatt, Laxman Pai, Shyavaksh Chavda, Sudhir Khastagir, Raju. Indradev Acharya and Bansilal Verma ‘Chakor' published cartoons in it.

It published special issues on Jawaharlal Nehru, Jhaverchand Meghani and short stories.

See also
 List of Gujarati-language magazines

References

External links
 

1963 establishments in Gujarat
1968 disestablishments in India
Defunct literary magazines
Defunct magazines published in India
Literary magazines published in India
Gujarati-language magazines
Magazines established in 1963
Magazines disestablished in 1968